Laurent Lucas (born 20 July 1965) is a French actor.

Life and career
A student of the Charles Dullin school, Lucas soon became one of the most admired young performers in the Strasbourg National Theatre. He first emerged on the scene with his role in I Hate Love, where he starred as an HIV positive man.

His most prominent part was that of a young father in the acclaimed psychological thriller Harry, He's Here To Help, before being cast in Dominik Moll's Lemming.

Filmography
 1997 : J'ai horreur de l'amour
 1998 : HLA identique
 1999 : Rien sur Robert
 1999 : Pola X
 1999 : La Nouvelle Ève
 1999 : Haut les cœurs!
 2000 : Harry, He's Here to Help
 2000 : 30 ans
 2001 : The Pornographer
 2002 : In My Skin
 2002 : Va, petite !
 2003 : Tiresia
 2003 : Who Killed Bambi?
 2003 : Adieu
 2003 : Rire et châtiment
 2004 : Violence des échanges en milieu tempéré
 2004 : Tout pour l'oseille
 2004 : The Ordeal
 2004 : Automne
 2005 : Lemming
 2005 : Les Invisibles
 2006 : De particulier à particulier
 2006 : On the Trail of Igor Rizzi (Sur la trace d'Igor Rizzi)
 2007 : Contre-enquête
 2007 : You (Toi)
 2008 : On War
 2008 : Mommy Is at the Hairdresser's (Maman est chez le coiffeur)
 2008 : All That She Wants (Elle veut le chaos)
 2010 : The Kate Logan Affair
 2010 : Verso 
 2010 : L'impasse du désir 
 2011 : À mi-chemin   
 2012 : Je me suis fait tout petit
 2013 : The Military Man (Le Militaire)
 2013: The Meteor (Le Météore)
 2013 : Le métis de Dieu (The Jewish Cardinal)
 2014 : Witnesses
 2014 : Alleluia
 2015 : Floride
 2015 : Rabid Dogs
 2015 : Les Démons
 2015 : Les Revenants
 2016 : Raw
 2016 : The Odyssey
 2016 : Les Hommes de l'ombre
 2017 : Le Bureau des Légendes
 2019 : Adoration
 2019 : Mont Foster
 2021 : Between Them (Toutes les deux)

References

External links

 

1965 births
Living people
French male stage actors
French male film actors
Male actors from Paris
20th-century French male actors
21st-century French male actors
French film producers